Karl Eduard von Eichwald (Eduard Ivanovich Eykhvald; 4 July 1795, in Mitau, Courland Governorate – 10 November 1876, in Saint Petersburg) was a Baltic German geologist, physician, and naturalist, who worked in Russia.

Career

Eichwald was a Baltic German born at Mitau in Courland Governorate. He became a doctor of medicine and professor of zoology in Kazan in 1823; four years later professor of zoology and comparative anatomy at Vilnius; in 1838 professor of zoology, mineralogy and medicine at St. Petersburg; and finally, professor of palaeontology in the institute of mines in that city.

He travelled much in the Russian Empire, and was a keen observer of its natural history and geology. He died at St. Petersburg.

Eichwald was a supporter of Darwinism.

Works
His published works include Reise auf dem Caspischen Meere und in den Caucasus, 2 vols. (Stuttgart and Tübingen, 1834-1838); Die Urwelt Russlands (St Petersburg, 1840-1845); Le Lethaea Rossica, ou Paléontologie de la Russie, 3 vols. (Stuttgart, 1852-1868), with Atlases.

In the scientific field of herpetology he described several new species of reptiles.

See also
 List of Baltic German scientists

Notes

References

External links 
Rulex.ru: Biography of Karl Eichwald—

Geologists from the Russian Empire
Latvian biologists
German taxonomists
1795 births
1876 deaths
Baltic-German people
Academic staff of Vilnius University
Biologists from the Russian Empire
Explorers from the Russian Empire
Paleontologists from the Russian Empire
Zoologists from the Russian Empire
Corresponding members of the Saint Petersburg Academy of Sciences
People from Jelgava
People from Courland Governorate
19th-century Latvian people
19th-century geologists
19th-century German zoologists
Physicians from the Russian Empire